Hanwada or Honwada is a Mandal in Mahbubnagar district, Telangana.

Geography
It has an average elevation of 510 metres (1676 ft).

Villages
The villages in Hanwada mandal include:
 Ayodhyanagar 	
 Buddaram 	
 Chinnadarpally 	
 Dachakpally 	
 
 Gundyala 	
 Hanwada 	
 Ibrahimbad
 Kistampally 	
 Kohtapeta 	
 Kongatpally 	
 Madharam 	
 Munimoksham 	
 Naginonipally 	
 Peddadarpally 	
 Sallonipally
 Shaik Pally 	
 Tankara 	
 Thirumalagiri 	
 Vepur

References

Mandals in Mahbubnagar district